Eucalyptus vittata is a species of mallet that is endemic to Western Australia. It has smooth bark, lance-shaped adult leaves, ribbed flower buds in groups of seven or nine, creamy white flowers and glaucous, hemispherical to cylindrical or cup-shaped fruit.

Description
Eucalyptus vittata is a mallet that typically grows to a height of  but does not form a lignotuber. It has smooth grey and creamy white bark that is shed in long ribbons.

Taxonomy and naming
Eucalyptus vittata was first formally described in 2009 by Dean Nicolle from a specimen he collected with Malcolm French on the road between Hyden and Norseman in 2001, and the description was published in the journal Nuytsia. The specific epithet (vittata) is from the Latin vittatus meaning "bound with a ribbon", referring to the long ribbons of bark hanging in the crown.

Distribution and habitat
This mallet grows on flats around dry salt lakes and clay pans or below breakaways, sometimes in pure stands near the north-eastern margin of the wheatbelt in the Avon Wheatbelt, Coolgardie, Mallee and Yalgoo biogeographic regions.

Conservation status
Eucalyptus vittata is classified as "not threatened" by the Government of Western Australia Department of Parks and Wildlife.

See also
List of Eucalyptus species

References

vittata
Endemic flora of Western Australia
Myrtales of Australia
Eucalypts of Western Australia
Plants described in 2009